The 1999–2000 season of the NOFV-Oberliga was the sixth season of the league at tier four (IV) of the German football league system.

The NOFV-Oberliga was split into two divisions, NOFV-Oberliga Nord and NOFV-Oberliga Süd. FC Schönberg 95 from the northern division entered into a play-off with southern champions FSV Hoyerswerda for the right to play FC Rot-Weiß Erfurt for a place in the following season's Regionalliga. FC Schönberg 95 won the first round of matches, but lost 4–2 on aggregate to FC Rot-Weiß Erfurt, and would have to play for a further season in the NOFV-Oberliga. As a result, no team was promoted, and due to Regionalliga restructuring, a total of 13 teams were relegated to the lower leagues.

North

South

External links 
 NOFV-Online – official website of the North-East German Football Association 

NOFV-Oberliga seasons
4
Germ